Pascoea dohrni is a species of beetle in the family Cerambycidae. It was described by Léon Fairmaire in 1833.

References

Tmesisternini
Beetles described in 1833